Ilze Ābola (born 15 May 1978) is a Latvian alpine skier. She competed in the 1998 Winter Olympics. Trained under Aldis Fimbauers and Jānis Ciaguns, multiple Latvian champion. In 1998, at the age of 19, she represented Latvia at the 1998 Winter Olympics, finishing 31st in the giant slalom.

References

1978 births
Living people
Alpine skiers at the 1998 Winter Olympics
Latvian female alpine skiers
Olympic alpine skiers of Latvia
People from Cēsis